Santa Anita is a district of the Lima Province in Peru. It is part of city of Lima.
Officially established as a district on October 25, 1989, from parts of Ate and El Agustino separated by the Rio Surco, a ditch which went all the way to Santiago de Surco.

The current mayor (alcalde) of Santa Anita is José Luis Nole. The district's postal code is 43.
The core sections of Santa Anita are: Santa Anita proper, originally a section of Ate; and Los Ficus and Universal, originally sections of El Agustino. Industrial areas to the east of Santa Anita and Universal mark the boundary with Ate.

Geography
The district has a total land area of 10.69 km2. Its administrative center is located 195 meters above sea level.

Boundaries
 North: El Agustino and Ate
 East: Ate
 South: El Agustino and Ate
 West: El Agustino

Demographics
According to a 2002 estimate by the INEI, the district has 154,359 inhabitants and a population density of 14,439.6 inhabitants/km2. In 1999, there were 27,908 households in the district.

See also 
 Administrative divisions of Peru

References

External links

  Municipal website

Districts of Lima